The women's lightweight (−63 kilograms) taekwondo event at the 2006 Asian Games took place on 7 December 2006 at Qatar SC Indoor Hall, Doha, Qatar.

A total of ten competitors from ten different countries (NOCs) competed in this event, limited to fighters whose body weight was less than 63 kilograms. 

Su Li-wen of Chinese Taipei won the gold medal after beating Chonnapas Premwaew of Thailand in the gold medal match 1–0, The bronze medal was shared by Manita Shahi of Nepal and Veronica Domingo from the Philippines.

The silver medalist Chonnapas Premwaew later changed her name to Dhunyanun Premwaew. She beat the Korean favorite Jin Chae-lin in the quarterfinal round 2–0.

Schedule
All times are Arabia Standard Time (UTC+03:00)

Results

References

Results

External links
Official website

Taekwondo at the 2006 Asian Games